The El Encino Stakes was an American Thoroughbred horse race run between 1954 and 2011 at Santa Anita Park in Arcadia, California. Open to four-year-old fillies,  it was raced over a distance of  miles (8.5 furlongs) on the synthetic Cushion Track surface. A Grade 2 event, it last offered a purse of $150,000

Part of Santa Anita Park's La Cañada Series of races, the El Encino Stakes was open to newly turning/turned 4-year-old fillies. Run at an increasing distance, the series began with the Grade I La Brea Stakes at 7 furlongs at the end of December followed by the El Encino Stakes at  miles (8.5 furlongs) in mid January, then the Grade 2 La Cañada Stakes at  miles (9 furlongs) in mid February. Created in 1975, only three fillies have ever won the series: Taisez Vous (1978), Mitterand (1985), and Got Koko (2003). The Santa Anita Park counterpart for male horses is the Strub Series.

Prior to 1976, the race was open to horses of either sex aged four and up.

The El Encino was inaugurated in 1954 as a handicap race on dirt at  miles. From 1955 through 1957 it was raced on turf at a distance of  miles after which it was suspended until 1968 when it returned as a  miles claiming stakes. There was no race in 1970 but returned the following year. In 1974 and 1975 it was modified to a distance  miles before being changed permanently in 1976 to  miles and restricted to four-year-old fillies.

Records
Speed record 1:40.61 @  miles): Zenyatta (2008) 

Most wins by a jockey:
 5 – Chris McCarron (1983, 1986, 1991, 2000)

Most wins by a trainer:
 4 – John Shirreffs (1999, 2006, 2008, 2009)

Most wins by an owner:
 3 – Golden Eagle Farm (1976, 1983, 1998)

Winners

*In 1998, I Ain't Bluffing won the race but was disqualified and set back to third.

External link
 El Encino Stakes at Pedigree Query

Discontinued horse races
Horse races in California
Santa Anita Park
Graded stakes races in the United States
Flat horse races for four-year-old fillies
Mile category horse races for fillies and mares
Racing series for horses
Recurring sporting events established in 1954
Recurring sporting events disestablished in 2012